Juan Francisco Gomez (born Buenos Aires 27 March 1984) is a professional rugby union rugby player. He started playing in Los Matreros Rugby Club. His debut game for his country, Argentina, was in 2006 when he was selected to play against Italy. The match took place in Rome where Argentina won 23–16. Juan joined Leinster Rugby in 2007, he moved to Leeds Carnegie in 2009. He is not the first of his countrymen to play their rugby for the Leeds Carnegie club. Other countrymen to have done so were Argentine internationals Diego Albanese, Pablo Bouza, Martin Schusterman and Alberto Di Bernardo.

External links
 From leedscarnegie.com
 From scrum.com

Living people
Argentine rugby union players
1984 births
Rugby union players from Buenos Aires
Argentina international rugby union players
Rugby union props
Leeds Tykes players
Leinster Rugby players
Stade Français players
Pampas XV players